The 2007 AMA Superbike Championship is the 32nd season of the AMA Superbike Championship

Season Calendar

Superbike Season Calendar

AMA Superbike

Rider Standings
Bold results denote pole position
Italic results denote fastest lap

AMA Superstock

Rider Standings

AMA Formula Xtreme

Rider Standings

AMA Supersport

Rider Standings

AMA Superbike Championship seasons
Ama Superbike
Ama superbike